Timescape is a 2022 Canadian action-adventure science fiction film about two young strangers discovering a mysterious spacecraft that catapults them millions of years into the past. The film was written, edited, and directed by Aristomenis Tsirbas. It premiered on July 31, 2022 at the Fantasia Film Festival, where it won the Silver Audience Award for Best Quebec Feature. Its theatrical rollout began on August 19, 2022 in the province of Quebec, Canada before expanding to the rest of the world.

Plot
Jason, a brilliant but misunderstood young boy, discovers a mysterious spacecraft that crash-landed in a nearby forest. Inside he meets Lara, an equally curious girl who discovered the alien craft moments before. While attempting to figure out how to operate the vessel, the two are catapulted back in time to final days of the great dinosaurs. The vessel is indeed a Time Machine. With the help of MIA, the ship’s floating mobile intelligent assistant, the adventurers race against time to repair the ship and return home before the spectacular impact of a historic asteroid.

Cast
 Sofian Oleniuk as Jason
 Lola Rossignol-Arts as Lara
 Patricia Summersett as Xev
 Aristomenis Tsirbas as the voice of MIA
 Michel Perron as Glenn
 Eric Davis as John
 Melissa Carter as Vivian
 Nathaniel Amranian as Brett
 Michael Broderick as Police Officer

Release
On August 19, 2022, TVA Films released Timescape thetrically in Quebec, Canada in 44 theaters. In December 2022, the film made its Canadian VOD debut on the streaming platforms AppleTV, iTunes, Google Play, and Bell Fibe, and on the Bell TV platform.

Reception
As of its first week in release, the film received positive reviews from critics. Province-wide Quebec publication Le Soleil gave it 3 out of 4 stars, calling it "A new classic" (Translated from French). Otaku no Culture gave it 4 out of 5 stars, concluding that "I can watch this movie repeatedly". The Montreal Gazette credited Timescape with, "This is the real deal, with CGI special effects to rival the best in the biz”

Accolades
Fantasia Film Festival 2022

References

External links
 
 

2022 films
2020s adventure films
2020 science fiction films
Canadian science fiction films
2020s English-language films
2020s Canadian films